Rutger Stuffken (born 11 August 1947) is a retired Dutch coxswain. He competed at the 1972 Summer Olympics in the eight event and finished in ninth place.

References

1947 births
Living people
Dutch male rowers
Olympic rowers of the Netherlands
Rowers at the 1972 Summer Olympics
Sportspeople from Heerlen